Iritty is a Municipality and a Taluk of Kannur district in Kerala State, India. The town is the main market place for the farmer communities in the surrounding regions. Iritty is known as The Coorg Valley in God's Own Country. Iritty is one of the major towns lies between Coorg and Kannur international airport -Mattanur.

Location

Iritty is located on the banks of Bavali river, which originates from the Wayanad passes. Iritty is situated on the Thalassery-Coorg-Mysore highway or State Highway 30 (Kerala) between Mattanur and Virajpet. Nearby smaller towns are Padiyoor, Peravoor, Kakkayangad, Aralam, Keezhppally, Vallithode, Karikkottakary, Angadikadavu, Anappanthy, Edoor, Ulikkal, Vattiyamthode, Mattara, Manikkadavu, Kilyianthara, Punnad, Charal, Edapuzha, Uruppumkutti, Vilakkode and Chavassery.

Geography

Iritty is surrounded by hills. A river flowing through Iritty is more commonly known as Iritty Puzha (Iritty River). There is a steel girder bridge, built in 1933, over the river. There is a dam in the place Pazhassi for irrigation purpose named 'Pazhassi Dam' which is almost 10 km from the town. Wayanad tourist destinations are near from this place. The nearby areas are depending on Iritty for most of their shopping. Payam, Aralam, Punnad, Vallithode, Kilyianthara, Kondambra, Kolikkadavu, Keezhur, Ulickal, Vattiyamthode, Mattara, Kalanki, Manikadave, Manippara Perumpally, Nuchiyad, Vayathoor, Edoor, Peratta, Karikottakari, Angadikadave, Puravayal, Kootupuzha, Charal, Alathupramba, Thermala, Urathoor, Vilakkode, Madathil etc. are the nearby small towns around.

Steel bridge

The steel bridge in Iritty is a 10-ton bridge constructed in 1933 by the British authorities to connect the towns of Kodagu and Thalassery. It was designed by George Anderson of the Institution of Civil Engineers. A July 2015 death of a man after being accidentally wedged between the handrail and a private bus raised concerns about the bridge's age.

Administration
Iritty was initially part of Keezhur-Chavassery Panchayat and upgraded to a Municipality on 1 November 2015. The Municipal town is divided into 33 wards. K Sreekala is the present municipal chairperson of Iritty. The current ruling party of Iritty Municipality is LDF.

Iritty Municipality is a part of Peravoor Assembly Constituency under Kannur Loksabha Constituency.

Iritty established as a Taluk headquarters since March 2013 when Kerala government declared new taluks for the state. Iritty taluk falls under Thalassery Revenue division.

Villages in Iritty Taluk

Iritty Taluk has 20 villages
 Aralam, Ayyankunnu, Chavasseri and Kalliad
 Kanichar, Karikkottakari, Keezhur and Kelakam 
 Kolari, Kottiyoor, Manathana and  Muzhakkunnu 
 Nuchiyad, Padiyoor, Payam and Pazhassi 
 Thillankeri, Vayathur, Vellarvalli and Vilamana

Etymology

Iritty, one of the beautiful hill side towns in the north Malabar of Kerala. The beauty of Iritty lies together with the unique rivers, streams, green hills and valleys. The main Streams of Iritty river are by the three rivers such as Bavali river, Aralam river and Barapuzha (Veni river). Before the name 'Iritty,' made the first cry, this land was nourished by two main rivers, one Barapuzha and Bavalipuzha . People started calling both the rivers confluence as Iratta puzha (Double River & 'Puzha' means River ), and in course of time the land became Iritty.

Climate
Iritty has a tropical monsoon climate (Am) with little to no rainfall from December to March and heavy to extremely heavy rainfall from April to November.

Transportation

Iritty lies at an equal distance from the nearby cities of Kannur, Thalassery, Mahe, Taliparamba and Virajpet (Karnataka State). The proposed Kannur Mysore National Highway or SH 30 passes through Iritty connecting Thalassery, Mattanur Airport and Kodagu. This was initially called the TC Road by the British. This highway is used by interstate bus services plying to Madikeri, Mysore and Bangalore.

SH 36 connects Iritty with Taliparamba that gives access to other towns like Irikkur and Sreekandapuram.
 
Keezhur is the starting point of Iritty town. This place is well-connected by road from both Kannur and Thalassery. There are frequent buses from Iritty and to both these places and to several places across Kerala including Kottayam, Cochin (Ernakulam), Mangalore, Kasaragod, Panathur, Kanhangad, Cherupuzha, Wayanad and Kozhikode. There is no railway line, with the nearest railway stations at Kannur and Thalassery. The nearest airport is Kannur International Airport, at Mattannur is located 19.5 km south-west of Iritty.

Commerce
Iritty is one of the major towns of the Kannur district. With nearby villages which produce cash crops and plantation crops, Iritty is a major commercial town too. It is one of the growing towns in the district. Iritty is famous for cash crops such as pepper, rubber and cashew nuts, some of which are sold under regional brands in various auction houses and commodities markets.

Iritty is primarily a trading town. Iritty is headquarters to several State Government offices. Most of these offices have jurisdiction over nearby towns like Mattanur and Peravoor.

Institutions / Government Firms in Iritty

 Fire Station Iritty
Taluk office iritty
 SIET CD MART (Project under Dept of Education - Kerala), Nr Fire Station, Iritty
 Labour Office NP Road Iritty
 Sub Treasury, Falcon Plaza Iritty 
 State Ware House Iritty
 KSFE New Bustand Iritty
 SUB RT OFFICE, FALCON PLAZA IRITTY
Co-operative society assistant registrar office, Iritty

Hospitals
  Amala Multi Speciality Hospital, Keezhur
 Sky Super Speciality Hospital, Iritty.
 Thulasi Malabar Hospital, Iritty.
 Karunya Hospital, Iritty.
 Nikhil Hospital, Iritty.
 Reena Nursing Home.
 Christu Raja Dental Clinic
 Asokan's Dental Clinic.
 ECHS Poly Clinic, Iritty
 Govt.Taluk Hospital, Iritty
 S M Hospital, Iritty
 R VISION EYE HOSPITAL, IRITTY.

Higher Education/ Technical Education/ IT Education/ Career Guidance
Tech Info Psc, iritty, PSC,SSC, RAILWAY,UPSC Coaching
 Mahatma Gandhi College, Iritty, affiliated to Kannur University, Affiliated to NAAC with 'A' grade
 Amala School of Nursing, affiliated with Indian Nursing Council
 Don Bosco College, Angadikadavu, a self-financing college affiliated to Kannur University
PRAGATHI career guidance & Bank coaching, Nerampokk road Iritty. Topest PSC coaching centre in Kannur district
 EMS Memorial College of Applied Science, Iritty
 Majlisu Nashathi Sunniyya, Uliyil
 Sree Narayana Guru College of Arts and Science, Veerpad, Iritty
 De Paul College, Edathotty, Kannur University
 Ideal Arabic College, Narempara, Uliyil, affiliated to kannur university
 Pushparam ITI (Pvt.), Iritty
 MG ITI under Iritty Educational Society, Keezhur Kunnu, Iritty
 Chaithanya Institute of Engineering, Nerampoku Road,  Iritty
 Nikhil School of Nursing
 Central Institute of education and Training, affiliated to Dept.of Technical Education, Govt.of kerala, NP Road Iritty
 Centre for Development of Imaging Technology (C-dit)
 Rutronix institute of Computer Education (Authorized Training Center Pravasi Edcucation )
 Sree Sankaracharya Computer Center, City Tower New Bus Stand Iritty 
 Sac IT Education
 CIIT Computer Training Centre, Nr Canera Bank Iritty
 CIMAS Animation Campus, Falcon Plaza Iritty
 Educare Academy Iritty
 NORKA Roots Skill Development Centre, Nr Sub Treasury Iritty
 CGFT Garment Training Centre Iritty
 UNIVERSAL College N P Road Iritty
 Pragathi Vidhyanikethan Nerampoke Road Iritty

Schools

 Iritty Higher Secondary School.
 Govt. UP school Vilakkode
 Global India Public School (GIPS) Vilakkode
 GHSS ULICKAL 
St. Thomas Higher Secondary School Manikkadavu
 St. Mary's Higher Secondary School, Edoor.
 St. Sebastian's Higher Secondary School, Velimanam.
 GHSS Aralam.
 St. Joseph's Higher secondary School, Kunnoth.
 Sacred Heart Higher Secondary School, Angadikkadavu.
 Govt. Higher Secondary School, Pala
 GHSS, padiyoor
 St.Thomas HSS, Kiliyanthara
 Govt. L.P. School, Peratta
 St. Joseph's English Medium School, Peratta
 Kavumbady Higher Secondary School
 GHSS Chavassery.
 St. Thomas High School, Karikkottakari.
 Govt. High School, Perinkari
 Zuhra UP School, Vellarivayal.
 St.Antony's U.P.School, Peratta
 Vazhunnavars UPS, Keezhur
 SDA English School Keezhur, Iritty
 St.John Baptist EHSS, Kadathumkadavu, Iritty
 CMI Christ School, Iritty
 Benhill English School, Iritty
 G.U.P School uliyil
 Vanivilasam L.P School uliyil
 Navajyothi English medium (CBSE) 
 Higher Secondary School, Edathotty 

 ST. GEORGE CHURCH PURAVAYAL

Pilgrim Centres & Religious Centres
Sharon Fellowship Church, Vallithode (Pentecostal Church)
The India Pentecostal church of God (IPC), Kolithattu
 Church at Keezhpally (Local Church)
Full Gospel Pentecostal church, Vallithode
Bethel Assemblies of God church, veerpad (Pentecostal church)
Assemblies of God church, Perinkiri (Pentecostal church)
Assemblies of God church, Arabi (Pentecostal church)
St. Mary's Church Mattara
 Vilakkode sree nittoor Shiva temple
 Sree Adiyerimadam Devi Temple, Aralam. Phone: 0490 2500400, 9745845100 http://www.adiyerimadam.com
 Sree Kairathi Kiratha Temple Iritty
 Sree Mahavishnu Temple Keezhur
 Sree Mahadeva Temple Keezhur
 Sree Puthiya Bhagavathi Kavu, Peumparamba
 Sree Mundayamparamba Tharakkumeethal Bhagavathi Temple
 Sree Vairee Khathakan kshethram, Payancheri 
 Sree Koorumba Bhagavathi temple Payancheri, Iritty
 Sree Kavoottu Paramba Ganapati-Mahadeva Temple, Keezhur kunnu
Sree Muthappan madappura, vallithode
 St. Mary's Forane Church Edoor
 St.Josephs Church Iritty
 St. George Church Puravayal
 Sacred Heart Church Angadikkadavu
 ST. SEBASTIAN CHURCH NELLIKKAMPOIL
St. Sebastian's Church, Madathil
 ST. Mary's church Thermala
 ST. Thomas church karikkottakary
ST. Mary's church edoor
ST. Sebastian's church velimanam
ST. John's C.S.I church, vallithode
St. Mary's Church, Kilianthara
St. Alphonsa church, Perinkari
St. Mary's and St. Thomas malakara Syrian orthodox church Kilianthara
 Valiyajuma palli Uliyil
St Chavara Church Keezhpally
 St. Antony's Church, Peratta

Tourism
Iritty and the surrounding areas have a choice of tourism attractions.

 Aralam Wildlife Sanctuary
 Pazhassi Dam and garden
 Kanjirakkolly waterfalls
 Perumparamba Mahatma Gandhi Park
 Coorg valleys
 Palchuram
 Elapeedika
 Krishnagiri river and Barapole hydroelectric project
 Central State farm at Aralam
 Steel girder bridge at Iritty built by British
 Chitravattam

Notable People
 Tintu Luka, an Indian athlete

See also

 Ambayathode,     Anappanthy,     Angadikadavu and     Aralam
     Ayyankunnu,     Edoor,     Elapeedika and     Kanichar
     Karikkottakary,     Keezhpally,     Keezhur and   Keezhurkunnu
     Kelakam,  Kiliyanthara,   Koloyad,     Kottakkuthazhe,     Kottiyoor and     Kottiyoor Temple
     Kottiyoor Vysakha Mahotsavam,     Kunnathoor Padi,     Malayampadi and     Manathana
     Manikkadavu,     Manippara,     Muzhakkunnu,     Nedumpoil and     Nuchiyad
 Peratta, Peravoor,    Punnad,     Tholambra,     Ulikkal,     Uruppumkutti and     Vallithode
     Vaniyappara,     Vattiyamthode,     Vayathur and     Vekkalam
      Velimanam, Vellarvelly Chungakkunnu and     Vilamana, Vilakkode

References

External links

 
 Website of Iritty

Cities and towns in Kannur district